In information theory, the bar product of two linear codes C2 ⊆ C1 is defined as

where (a | b) denotes the concatenation of a and b. If the code words in C1 are of length n, then the code words in C1 | C2 are of length 2n.

The bar product is an especially convenient way of expressing the Reed–Muller RM (d, r) code in terms of the Reed–Muller codes RM (d − 1, r) and RM (d − 1, r − 1).

The bar product is also referred to as the | u | u+v | construction
or (u | u + v) construction.

Properties

Rank
The rank of the bar product is the sum of the two ranks:

Proof
Then the set

is a basis for the bar product .

Hamming weight
The Hamming weight w of the bar product is the lesser of (a) twice the weight of C1, and (b) the weight of C2:

Proof
For all ,

which has weight . Equally

for all  and has weight . So minimising over  we have

If  then:

 

If  then

 

so

See also
 Reed–Muller code

References

Information theory
Coding theory